Eohyllisia is a genus of beetles in the family Cerambycidae, containing the following species:

 Eohyllisia albolineata Breuning, 1942
 Eohyllisia allardi Breuning, 1958
 Eohyllisia luluensis Breuning, 1948
 Eohyllisia strandi Breuning, 1943

References

Agapanthiini